Boomerang is the second studio album by British duo the Creatures (a.k.a. singer Siouxsie Sioux and musician Budgie). The album was recorded in Spain with Mike Hedges, in Jerez de la Frontera, in Andalusia. It features brass arrangements including trumpet, trombone and saxophone.

Boomerang received widespread critical acclaim from British music critics, who praised Siouxsie's vocals and the choice of a wide range of musical styles on the album, including blues, jazz and Spanish styles such as flamenco. The album was later hailed by singer Jeff Buckley, who covered the song "Killing Time".

Background, recording and music
The album was recorded in a ranch in the province of Cádiz in Andalusia with producer Mike Hedges, one year after Peepshow. All the instruments and the voices were done in Spain, bar the brass arrangements that were recorded later in London  with Peter Thoms on trombone, Gary Barnacle on saxophone and Enrico Tomasso on trumpet. Budgie conceived the brass arrangements with Peter Thoms, they both had previously worked with a horns section six years earlier on the "Right Now" single. "Pluto Drive" is the only song entirely recorded at their return in England.

Critics remarked on the musical diversity on the record, saying that it was "a varied collection of fine, if not earth-shaking work. Each of the 14 tracks has something different to offer". "Manchild" features a "flamenco rhythmic inflexion and savannah sunset trumpets", while the trumpet-tinged "Strolling Wolf" is an "Iberian-inspired piece".

Blues and jazz elements are also featured on the album, such as on the bluesy "Killing Time" and "Willow". In a different style, "Pluto Drive" "marries a sassy low R&B base to futuristic ambient sound", with electronic loops. "Pity" is a lullaby, with Budgie playing Jamaican steel drums.

While being in Spain, photographer Anton Corbijn joined the band to shoot several pictures for the CD album booklet and the sleeves of the two singles. It was the first time Corbijn took photographs of musicians in colour, using filters: he then designed the artwork for Boomerang with Area.

Lyrics
Budgie explained the song "Manchild": "It's a story based in Colombia before the drugs cartel, it's about a small child caught up in a feud, this vendetta between his village and another rival village. In a minor way it is all about drug trafficking, but ends with the stronger village wiping out the whole male population of the other village until there was just one boy left called Nelsito. It was understood that he would live till he was at least 18 before he was assassinated, but he was shot on the way to school."

He also commented on "Willow": "It's kind of about how my mother died as it was a black area and I hadn't realised what had happened until I saw my brother. He told me what went on with the family and I never really knew until a year afterwards, and I wrote it down directly after that".

Reception and release

The album was released to critical acclaim. NME'''s Roger Morton qualified it as "a rich and unsettling landscape of exotica", praising "the pre-eminence of Budgie's Spanish-tribal-jazz drumming". Simon Reynolds of Melody Maker stated that "Boomerang abounds with scarcely anticipated brilliance", qualifying it as "inventive and invigorated music". In a retrospective review, AllMusic hailed Siouxsie's performance, saying: "Sioux's singing is some of her best both in and out of the Banshees, still retaining the shadowed mystery that she makes her own while drawing on an interesting range of styles".Boomerang was released in CD, vinyl and cassette formats by both Polydor Records and Geffen Records.

Legacy
Jeff Buckley covered "Killing Time" several times between 1992 and 1995. He recorded a rendition for radio station WFMU, and also performed it at his first major London concert at the Astoria after the release of Grace.

Media
In 2008, "Standing There" was used by two dancers in the jazz category in the US television show So You Think You Can Dance''. In 2012, "You!" was chosen in season 9 of the same TV show.

Track listing
All songs written and composed by Siouxsie and Budgie.
 "Standing There" – 3:06
 "Manchild" – 3:50
 "You!" – 4:03
 "Pity" – 3:39
 "Killing Time" – 3:26
 "Willow" – 2:06
 "Pluto Drive" – 4:40
 "Solar Choir" – 2:52
 "Speeding" – 4:12
 "Fury Eyes" – 2:10
 "Fruitman" – 2:46
 "Untiedundone" – 3:41
 "Simoom" – 3:43
 "Strolling Wolf" – 4:27
 "Venus Sands" – 5:03
 "Morriña" – 2:49

 "Solar Choir" and "Speeding" were not included on the vinyl issue of the album.

Personnel
The Creatures
Siouxsie Sioux – voice, instruments  
Budgie – drums, percussion, other instruments
with:
Peter Thoms – trombone 
Gary Barnacle – saxophone 
Enrico Tomasso – trumpet on "Manchild"
Martin McCarrick – accordion on "Speeding"
Antonio Partida, Domingo Ortega, Eva Ruiz-Verdijo, Innia Ortega, Nuria Fernandez, Rafael Cancelo - Flamenco performers on "Manchild"
Technical
Mike "Spike" Drake - engineer
Anton Corbijn - sleeve, cover photography

References

The Creatures albums
1989 albums
Geffen Records albums
Polydor Records albums
Albums produced by Mike Hedges